The Nickelodeon Kids Choice Awards Argentina 2011 took place on 11 October 2011 at 20:00 hrs (Argentine Time) in the Microestadio Malvinas Argentinas in the city of Buenos Aires. Nicolás Vázquez was presented as host. The nominees were presented on 22 August 2011 for 14 categories. Pro-social Award was presented to the Foundation of Southern Ideas Marcelo Tinelli and the lifetime achievement award was given to Cris Morena .
The musical performances during the awards were telecasts Teen Angels. that carry out the single "Que Llegue tu Voz" and "Mirame, Mirate" from their album TeenAngels 5. Dulce Maria, Tan Bionica and Sueña conmigo of performances during the telecast of the event, and each sang a medley of some of his latest hits.
As in previous years, voting was conducted online through the official website of the program. In addition, the network of Facebook page also can vote through Facebook accounts 'fans' first channel.

Background 
The editing in Argentina was confirmed in early 2011. Original event earlier this year, but Nickelodeon then confirmed that the show take place after the 2011 Kids Choice Awards Mexico. In August 2011 it was confirmed that the presenter would be Nicolás Vázquez.

Hosts 
Nicolás Vázquez

Announcer 
Roger (fictional character Nickelodeon)

Performers 

The cast of Sueña conmigo ("Sueña Conmigo")
Dulce María ("Ya No")
Tan Bionica ("Ella")
Teen Angels ("Que Llegue tu Voz" and "Mirame, Mirate")

Presenters 
Agustín Almeyda
Roger González
María del Cerro
Guido Kaczka
Valeria Baroni
Gabo Ramos
Benjamín Amadeo
Vanessa Leiro
Brenda Asnicar
Franco Massini
Juan Ciancio
MR
Valeria Gastaldi
Evaluna Montaner
Eiza González
Guido Penneli
Favio Posca
Lucia Precul
Santiago Ramundo
Griselda Siciliani
María Eugenia Suárez
Gastón Vietto
Pablo Martínez
Candela Vetrano
Matías Martin

Categories

Newcomer on TV

Favourite Actor

Favourite Actress

Athlete of the Year

Favourite Latin Singer or Band

Favourite International Singer

Favourite Song

Favourite Animated Show

Favourite Villain

Favourite Latin TV Show

Favourite International TV Show

Favourite Animated Film

Favourite Videogame

References 

Kids' Choice Awards
Nickelodeon Kids' Choice Awards